David Byrne Live at Union Chapel is a DVD of a live performance at the London church of the same name by David Byrne released on October 26, 2004.

Track listing
All songs written by David Byrne, except where noted:
"(Nothing But) Flowers" (Byrne, Chris Frantz, Jerry Harrison, Tina Weymouth)
"And She Was"
"Once in a Lifetime" (Byrne, Brian Eno, Frantz, Harrison, Weymouth)
"God's Child"
"The Great Intoxication"
"" (Giuseppe Verdi)
"The Revolution"
"Sax and Violins" (Byrne, Frantz, Harrison, Weymouth)
"This Must Be the Place (Naive Melody)" (Byrne, Frantz, Harrison, Weymouth)
"What a Day That Was"
"Like Humans Do"
"U.B. Jesus"
"Life During Wartime" (Byrne, Frantz, Harrison, Weymouth)
"Lazy" (Byrne, X-Press 2)
"I Wanna Dance with Somebody (Who Loves Me)" (George Merrill, Shannon Rubicam)
"Ausencia" (Goran Bregović, Teofilo Chantre)
"The Accident"
"Road to Nowhere" (Byrne, Frantz, Harrison, Weymouth)

Personnel
David Byrne – vocals, guitar
Paul Frazier – bass
David Hilliard – drums
Mauro Refosco – percussion
The Tosca Strings:
Jamie Desautels – violin
Tracy Seeger – violin
Leigh Mahoney – violin
Ames Asbell – viola
Doug Harvey – cello
Sara Nelson – cello

Release history

References

External links
DavidByrne.com on David Byrne Live at Union Chapel

David Byrne live albums
2004 video albums
Live video albums
2004 live albums
David Byrne video albums
Nonesuch Records live albums
Nonesuch Records video albums